This is a list of Sri Lankan film directors.



A
 Tissa Abeysekara

B
 Dharmasiri Bandaranayake

D 
 Malaka Dewapriya

F
 Gamini Fonseka

G

 Siri Gunasinghe

H
 Asoka Handagama

J
 Vimukthi Jayasundara

K
 Boodee Keerthisena

M
 Sudath Mahaadivulwewa

N
 D. B. Nihalsingha

O
 Vasantha Obeysekera

P
 Dharmasena Pathiraja
 Lester James Peries
 Sumitra Peries
 H. D. Premaratne
 Sanjeewa Pushpakumara

R

 King Ratnam
 Ranjan Ramanayake
 Pradeepan Raveendran

T
 Titus Thotawatte

V
 Prasanna Vithanage

W

 Sirisena Wimalaweera

See also

Sri Lankan film directors
Film directors
Sri Lankan